Im Hye-suk (born 18 October 1965) is a South Korean volleyball player. She competed at the 1984 Summer Olympics and the 1988 Summer Olympics.

References

1965 births
Living people
South Korean women's volleyball players
Olympic volleyball players of South Korea
Volleyball players at the 1984 Summer Olympics
Volleyball players at the 1988 Summer Olympics
Place of birth missing (living people)
Asian Games medalists in volleyball
Volleyball players at the 1986 Asian Games
Medalists at the 1986 Asian Games
Asian Games bronze medalists for South Korea